Eguinaldo de Sousa Lemos (born 9 August 2004) is a Brazilian footballer who plays as a forward for Real Madrid.

Club career
Born in Monção, Maranhão, Eguinaldo played football on the floodplains of his hometown, playing in local competitions. He started his career with Artsul, joining in 2021, and rapidly progressing to the first team, where he featured in the Campeonato Carioca Série A2.

Having spent time on loan at Vasco da Gama, playing for their youth and senior sides, the deal was made permanent on 4 August 2022, with Eguinaldo signing a contract through 2027.

International career
Eguinaldo was called up to the Brazil national under-20 football team in September 2022.

Style of play
Eguinaldo is one of the fastest players in world football, clocking a top speed of 37.5km/h in a Série B game against Novorizontino in October 2022.

Career statistics

Club

Notes

References

External links

2004 births
Living people
Sportspeople from Maranhão
Brazilian footballers
Association football forwards
Campeonato Brasileiro Série B players
Artsul Futebol Clube players
CR Vasco da Gama players